The Angkasapuri Komuter station is a KTM Komuter train station located near Angkasapuri, Kuala Lumpur. It is served by the Port Klang Line. The station primarily serves and is named after Angkasapuri, the headquarters of RTM.

Located nearby are the Sri Damesh private school and the neighbourhoods of Pantai Dalam and Kampung Kerinchi. The Kerinchi and Abdullah Hukum LRT stations are also nearby, although pedestrian access is almost impossible.

Feeder buses

Gallery

External links
 Angkasapuri KTM Komuter Station

Railway stations in Kuala Lumpur
Railway stations opened in 1995
Port Klang Line